Ferydoun Sadeghi (died December 2005) was an Iranian basketball player. He competed in the men's tournament at the 1948 Summer Olympics.

References

Year of birth missing
2005 deaths
Iranian men's basketball players
Olympic basketball players of Iran
Basketball players at the 1948 Summer Olympics
Place of birth missing